R. T. Price House is a historic home located at Williamson, Mingo County, West Virginia. It was designed by noted West Virginia architect Levi J. Dean and built about 1940.  It has a -story main block with one story east and west wings.  It has side gable roofs, and is faced in red brick.  The house exhibits design features in the Tudor Revival style.

It was listed on the National Register of Historic Places in 1991.

References

Houses on the National Register of Historic Places in West Virginia
Tudor Revival architecture in West Virginia
Houses completed in 1940
Houses in Mingo County, West Virginia
National Register of Historic Places in Mingo County, West Virginia